Conry is a civil parish in County Westmeath, Ireland.

Conry is one of 9 civil parishes in the barony of Rathconrath in the Province of Leinster.

Conry civil parish comprises the Hill of Uisneach and 13 townlands: Adamstown, Aghabrack, Carn, Clonownmore, Clonyrina, Gneevestown, Jamestown, Kellybrook, Lalistown, Lockardstown, Mweelra, Rathnew, Togherstown and
Ushnagh Hill.

The neighbouring civil parishes are: Ballymorin and Rathconrath to the north, Churchtown to the east, Ardnurcher, or Horseleap and Castletownkindalen to the south and Killare to the west.

References

External links
Conry civil parish at the IreAtlas Townland Data Base
Conry civil parish at townlands.ie
Conry civil parish at The Placenames Database of Ireland

Civil parishes of County Westmeath